{{DISPLAYTITLE:C18H22BrNO3}}
The molecular formula C18H22BrNO3 (molar mass: 380.28 g/mol, exact mass: 379.0783 u) may refer to:

 25B-NBOMe
 Morphine methylbromide

Molecular formulas